or  is a lake on the border between Norway and Sweden. It is almost entirely located in Bardu Municipality in Troms og Finnmark county in Norway, but a very small area crosses over into Kiruna Municipality in Norrbotten County in Sweden. Its shoreline measures .

References

Bardu
Norway–Sweden border
International lakes of Europe
Lakes of Norrbotten County
Lakes of Troms og Finnmark